14 Ceti is a single star in the equatorial constellation of Cetus. It is faintly visible to the naked eye under good viewing conditions, having an apparent visual magnitude of 5.84.

Gray (1989) as well as Houk and Swift (1999) have this star classified as an F-type main-sequence star with a stellar classification of F5 V. However, in the 5th revised edition of the Bright Star Catalogue it was classed by Hoffleit and Warren (1991) as a more evolved subgiant star with a class of F5 IV. The absolute magnitude and effective temperature for this star shows that it is entering the Hertzsprung gap, which is occupied by a class of stars that have consumed the hydrogen at their core but have not yet begun hydrogen fusion along a shell surrounding the center.

Evolutionary models for this star give an estimated age of around 2.1 billion years with 1.6 times the mass of the Sun. It has 2.6 times the Sun's radius and is radiating 10.7 times the Sun's luminosity from its photosphere at an effective temperature of about 6,583 K. There is a thin convective envelope near its surface. The star has a lower abundance of elements more massive than helium – what astronomers' term the metallicity – compared to the Sun. The projected rotational velocity is a relatively low 5 km/s, but the rotation rate is unknown since the axial tilt hasn't been determined.

This made it the only known star between classes F0 and F7 to have a Zeeman effect detected. Two possible explanations for this field are that it is a fast rotator with a dynamo-driven field, or that it is a former Ap star. The activity properties of this star make it more likely to be the latter.

References

F-type main-sequence stars
F-type subgiants
Cetus (constellation)
Durchmusterung objects
003229
002787
0143